Pip Eastop (born 1958) is a virtuoso horn player from London, England. He studied at the Royal Academy of Music from 1974 to 1976, leaving to take up the position of Principal Horn with the Antwerp Philharmonic Orchestra (now known as the Royal Flemish Philharmonic Orchestra).

The following year he became Principal Horn of the London Sinfonietta.

Between 1983 and 1986 he trained as a teacher of the Alexander Technique and from 1987 taught this discipline for four years, later incorporating his understanding the technique into his brass and woodwind teaching method.

He has been a professor of horn at the Royal Academy of Music since 1993 and at the Royal College of Music since 1995.

He has held principal horn positions with the London Sinfonietta, the Wallace Collection (a now-defunct brass ensemble) and the Gabrieli Consort. In 2005 he became Principal Horn with the London Chamber Orchestra.

In 1996, The Arts Council of Great Britain awarded Pip Eastop a research development grant to explore "the possibilities of controlling computer-driven transformation of sound during live, partially improvised performance".  This work was undertaken in collaboration with the composer Edward Williams.

His recording of the Mozart horn concertos was released in 2015.

External links
 Pip Eastop's website
 Royal Flemish Philharmonic website

References

English classical horn players
1958 births
Living people
Alumni of the Royal Academy of Music
Academics of the Royal Academy of Music